The Gospel According to St. Matthew ("The Gospel According to Matthew"; "St. Matthew" would be "San Matteo") is a 1964 Italian biblical drama film in the neorealist style, written and directed by Pier Paolo Pasolini. It is a cinematic rendition of the story of Jesus (portrayed by non-professional actor Enrique Irazoqui) according to the Gospel of Matthew, from the Nativity through the Resurrection. The dialogue is taken directly from the Gospel of Matthew, as Pasolini felt that "images could never reach the poetic heights of the text." He reportedly chose Matthew's Gospel over the others because he had decided that "John was too mystical, Mark too vulgar, and Luke too sentimental."

The film is considered a classic of world cinema and the neorealist genre. After initial release, it won the Venice Film Festival Grand Jury Prize, and three Nastro d'Argento Awards including Best Director. It was also nominated for three Academy Awards. In 2015, the Vatican City newspaper L'Osservatore Romano called it the best film on Christ ever made.

Plot

In Galilee during the Roman Empire, Jesus of Nazareth travels around the country with his disciples, healing the blind, raising the dead, exorcising demons and proclaiming the arrival of the Kingdom of God and the salvation of Israel. He claims to be the Son of God and so, therefore, the prophesied Messiah of Israel, which brings him into direct confrontation with the Jewish temple leaders. He is arrested, handed over to the Romans and charged with sedition against the Roman state, of which he is declared innocent by the Roman governor of Judea, but is, nevertheless, crucified at the behest of the Temple leaders. He rises from the dead after three days.

Cast

 Enrique Irazoqui as Christ 
 Margherita Caruso as Mary
 Susanna Pasolini as older Mary
 Marcello Morante as Joseph 
 Mario Socrate as John the Baptist 
 Settimio Di Porto as Peter
 Alfonso Gatto as Andrew
 Luigi Barbini as James
 Giacomo Morante as John
 Giorgio Agamben as Phillip
 Guido Cerretani as Bartholomew
 Rosario Migale as Thomas
 Ferruccio Nuzzo as Matthew
 Marcello Galdini as James, son of Alphaeus
 Elio Spaziani as Thaddaeus
 Enzo Siciliano as Simon
 Otello Sestili as Judas Iscariot
 Rodolfo Wilcock as Caiaphas
 Alessandro Tasca as Pontius Pilate
 Amerigo Bevilacqua as Herod the Great
 Francesco Leonetti as Herod Antipas
 Franca Cupane as Herodias
 Paola Tedesco as Salome
 Rossana Di Rocco as Angel of the Lord
 Renato Terra as the possessed man
 Eliseo Boschi as Joseph of Arimathea
 Natalia Ginzburg as Mary of Bethany
 Ninetto Davoli as a shepherd

Production

Background and pre-production
In 1963, the figure of Christ appeared in Pier Paolo Pasolini's short film La ricotta, included in the omnibus film RoGoPaG, which led to controversy and a jail sentence for the allegedly blasphemous and obscene content in the film. According to Barth David Schwartz's book Pasolini Requiem (1992), the impetus for the film took place in 1962. Pasolini had accepted Pope John XXIII's invitation for a new dialogue with non-Catholic artists, and subsequently visited the town of Assisi to attend a seminar at a Franciscan monastery there. The papal visit caused traffic jams in the town, leaving Pasolini confined to his hotel room; there, he came across a copy of the New Testament. Pasolini read all four Gospels straight through, and he claimed that adapting a film from one of them "threw in the shade all the other ideas for work I had in my head." Unlike previous cinematic depictions of Jesus' life, Pasolini's film does not embellish the biblical account with any literary or dramatic inventions, nor does it present an amalgam of the four Gospels (subsequent films which would adhere as closely as possible to one Gospel account are 1979's Jesus, based on the Gospel of Luke, and 2003's The Gospel of John). Pasolini stated that he decided to "remake the Gospel by analogy" and the film's sparse dialogue all comes directly from the Bible.

Given Pasolini's well-known reputation as an atheist, a homosexual, and a Marxist, the reverential nature of the film came as a surprise, especially after the controversy of La ricotta. At a press conference in 1966, Pasolini was asked why he, an unbeliever, had made a film which dealt with religious themes; his response was, "If you know that I am an unbeliever, then you know me better than I do myself. I may be an unbeliever, but I am an unbeliever who has a nostalgia for a belief." Therefore, he sets his criticism against a backdrop of sheer religious concern for the role assumed by the Church, the organization, for centuries.

On the idea of analogy, Pasolini emphasized his intention of not reproducing exactly a historic, casual Christ, but projecting the present-day society of southern Italy onto that figure, a Christ after 2,000 years of narrative build-up. As he explained,

Along with this method of reconstruction by analogy, we find the idea of myth and epics [...] so when narrating the history of Christ, I did not reconstruct Christ such as he actually was. If I had reconstructed Christ's history as it actually was, I would not have made a religious film, since I am not a believer. I do not think Christ was God's son. I would have made a positivist or Marxist reconstruction if any, so at the best of cases, a life of one of the five or six thousands saints preaching at that moment in Palestine. However, I did not want to do that, I am not interested in profanations: that is just a fashion I loathe, it is petit bourgeois. I want to consecrate things again, because that is possible, I want to re-mythologize them. I did not want to reconstruct the life of Christ as it really was, I wanted to make the history of Christ plus two thousand years of Christian storytelling about the life of Christ, since it is the two thousands years of Christian history that have mythologized this biography, one that as such would have been virtually insignificant otherwise. My film is the life of Christ after two thousands years of stories on the life of Christ. That is what I had in mind.

The film was dedicated to John XXIII. The announcement at the opening credits reads that it is "dedicato alla cara, lieta, familiare memoria di Giovanni XXIII" ("dedicated to the dear, joyous, familiar memory of Pope John XXIII"). Pasolini was particularly critical with the new Pope Paul VI (1963), at a moment when he was drafting a storyboard for a follow-up to the film, this time on Paul the Apostle. The project due for 1966–1967 never took off, but it was advanced.

Filming and style
Pasolini employed many of the techniques of Italian neorealism in the making of his film. Most of the actors he hired were non-professionals. Enrique Irazoqui (Jesus) was a 19-year-old economics student from Spain and a communist activist, while the rest of the cast were mainly locals from Barile, Matera, and Massafra, where the film was shot (Pasolini visited the Holy Land but found the locations unsuitable and "commercialized"). His location scouting in the Holy Land is documented in the adjoining feature-length documentary Location Hunting in Palestine, released a year later. Pasolini cast his own mother, Susanna, as the elderly mother of Jesus. The cast also included noted intellectuals such as writers Enzo Siciliano and Alfonso Gatto, poets Natalia Ginzburg and Rodolfo Wilcock, and philosopher Giorgio Agamben. In addition to the original biblical source, Pasolini used references to "2,000 years of Christian painting and sculptures" throughout the film. The look of the characters is also eclectic and, in some cases, anachronistic, resembling artistic depictions of different eras (the costumes of the Roman soldiers and the Pharisees, for example, are influenced by Renaissance art, whereas Jesus' appearance has been likened to that in Byzantine art as well as the work of Expressionist artist Georges Rouault). Pasolini later described the film as "the life of Christ plus 2,000 years of storytelling about the life of Christ."

Pasolini described his experience filming The Gospel According to Matthew as very different from his previous films. He stated that while his shooting style on his previous film Accattone was "reverential," when his shooting style was applied to a biblical source it "came out rhetorical. ... And then when I was shooting the baptism scene near Viterbo I threw over all my technical preconceptions. I started using the zoom, I used new camera movements, new frames which were not reverential, but almost documentary [combining] an almost classical severity with the moments that are almost Godardian, for example in the two trials of Christ shot like 'cinema verite.' ... The Point is that ... I, a non-believer, was telling the story through the eyes of a believer. The mixture at the narrative level produced the mixture stylistically."

Music
The score of the film, arranged by Luis Enríquez Bacalov, is eclectic; ranging from Johann Sebastian Bach (e.g. Mass in B Minor and St Matthew Passion) to Odetta ("Sometimes I Feel Like a Motherless Child"), to Blind Willie Johnson ("Dark Was the Night, Cold Was the Ground"), to the Jewish ceremonial declaration "Kol Nidre" and the "Gloria" from the Congolese Missa Luba. Pasolini stated that all of the film's music was of a sacred or religious nature from all parts of the world and multiple cultures or belief systems. Bacalov also composed several original musical tracks.

Reception

The film received mostly positive reviews from critics, including several Christian critics. Philip French called it "a noble film," and Alexander Walker said that "it grips the historical and psychological imagination like no other religious film I have seen. And for all its apparent simplicity, it is visually rich and contains strange, disturbing hints and undertones about Christ and his mission."

Some Marxist film critics, however, wrote unfavorable reviews. Oswald Stack criticized the film's "abject concessions to reactionary ideology." In response to criticism from the left, Pasolini admitted that, in his opinion, "there are some horrible moments I am ashamed of. ... The Miracle of the loaves and the fishes and Christ walking on water are disgusting Pietism." He also stated that the film was "a reaction against the conformity of Marxism. The mystery of life and death and of suffering – and particularly of religion ... is something that Marxists do not want to consider. But these are and have always been questions of great importance for human beings."

The Gospel According to Matthew was ranked number 10 (in 2010) and number 7 (in 2011) in the Arts and Faith website's Top 100 Films, also is in the Vatican's list of 45 great films and Roger Ebert's Great Movies list.

On Rotten Tomatoes the film has an approval rating of 92%, based on 36 reviews, and an average rating of 8.6 out of 10, with the critics consensus saying "The Gospel According to St. Matthew forgoes the pageantry of biblical epics in favor of a naturalistic retelling of the Christ story, achieving a respectful if not reverent interpretation with political verve."

Awards
At the 25th Venice International Film Festival, The Gospel According to Matthew was screened in competition for the Golden Lion, and won the OCIC Award and the Silver Lion. At the film's premiere, a crowd gathered to boo Pasolini but cheered him after the film was over. The film later won the Grand Prize at the International Catholic Film Office.

The film was nominated for the UN Award at the 21st British Academy Film Awards.

The Gospel According to Matthew was released in the United States in 1966 and was nominated for three Academy Awards: Art Direction (Luigi Scaccianoce), Costume Design (Danilo Donati), and Score.

Alternate versions
The 2007 Region 1 DVD release from Legend Films features a colourised, English-dubbed version of the film, in addition to the original, black-and-white Italian-language version. (The English-dubbed version is significantly shorter than the original, with a running time of 91 minutes – roughly 40 minutes shorter than the standard version.)

References

Further reading
 Bart Testa, "To Film a Gospel ... and Advent of the Theoretical Stranger," in Patrick Rumble and Bart Testa (eds.), Pier Paolo Pasolini: Contemporary Perspectives. University of Toronto Press, Inc., 1994, pp. 180–209. .
 "Pasolini, Il Cristo dell'Eresia (Il Vangelo secondo Matteo). Sacro e censura nel cinema di Pier Paolo Pasolini (Edizioni Joker, 2009) by Erminia Passannanti,

External links
 
 
 

1964 films
1964 drama films
Films about Jesus
Film portrayals of Jesus' death and resurrection
Films directed by Pier Paolo Pasolini
Films about communism
Films shot in Matera
Gospel of Matthew
Italian drama films
Cultural depictions of John the Baptist
1960s Italian-language films
Marxist works
Pope John XXIII
Portrayals of the Virgin Mary in film
Religious epic films
Venice Grand Jury Prize winners
Films scored by Luis Bacalov
Caiaphas
Cultural depictions of Pontius Pilate
Portrayals of Saint Joseph in film
Cultural depictions of Saint Peter
Depictions of Herod the Great on film
Cultural depictions of Salome
1960s Italian films